Luihin ja ytimiin is Mokoma's sixth album. It was released 2007. The album was released in three different versions. Besides normal digipak-edition there was limited edition, which had photographycollage made by Joonas Brandt. It also had interview about the album by vocalist Marko Annala and guitarist Tuomo Saikkonen and music video of "Nujerra ihminen".

The album was released, besides from CD, as vinyl like the three previous albums.

Track listing
 "Sinä riität" - 3.23 "You are enough"
 "Nujerra ihminen" - 4.01  "Defeat the human"
 "Veriveljet" - 2.55 "Blood brothers"
 "Entistä ehompi" - 4.08 "Better than before"
 "Kolmannen asteen kuulustelu" - 3.26 "Third degree interrogation"
 "Sahalaita" - 2.33 "Saw-Edge"
 "Turvaa selusta" - 3.40 "Cover my back"
 "Sarvipää" - 3.57 "One with the horns"
 "Marras" - 4.01 "November"
 "Irvikuva - 3.32 "Abomination"
 "Luo nahka luo sisus - 4.04 "Shapeshift"
 "Ammu, hautaa ja vaikene" - 5.51 "Shoot, shovel and fall silent"

Personnel

 Marko Annala - vocals
 Kuisma Aalto - guitar, backing vocals
 Tuomo Saikkonen - guitar, backing vocals
 Janne Hyrkäs - drums
 Santtu Hämäläinen – bass, guitar (on tracks ”Turvaa selusta”, ”Irvikuva” and ”Ammu, hautaa ja vaikene”)

2007 albums
Mokoma albums